Evermore is a self-titled greatest hits album by New Zealand rock band Evermore released on 14 October 2009 in the UK and 12 March 2010 in Australia and New Zealand. The album is a collection of songs from the band's entire history, as well as three new songs including the single "Underground". It was the band's first album to be released in Europe, following a recording contract with Warner Bros. The new songs were written while the band was a supporting act for Pink's Funhouse Tour in Europe. Band member Jon Hume described the album as "a crazy mishmash of all the music that [Evermore has] made over the last seven or eight years".

The first single "Underground" was released to radio in late January 2010 and later as a digital download on 19 February 2010. The Australian and New Zealand release of the album came packaged with a limited edition DVD, featuring a live performance from the band filmed at the O2 Arena in London. The DVD also includes documentary footage of the band travelling around Europe with American pop singer Pink. The Irish and United Kingdom iTunes release of the album contains three remixes as bonus tracks.

Several of the singles from Truth of the World have been edited to eliminate the concept interludes from the original album, with some receiving newly recorded parts and altered music such as "Everybody's Doing It" receiving a new ending, "Hey Boys and Girls" receiving a new beginning (taken from the end of "Max Is Stable") and a re-recorded mid-verse, "Between the Lines" now having a new intro and the speech in the middle removed (the same as the radio edit).

Track listing

 The Australian DVD also contains clips of the band on the road in Europe in addition to the listed songs.
 Some versions of the UK release came with a digital booklet.

Charts

Personnel
Jon Hume – vocals, guitars, percussion, synthesizers, programming, production
Peter Hume – bass, keyboards, vocals, piano, synthesizers, programming
Dann Hume – drums, vocals, guitars, piano, percussion, programming

References

2009 compilation albums
Evermore (band) albums
Warner Music Australasia albums